Ali Saeed Al-Balochi (born 27 November 2000), is an Emirati professional footballer who plays as a midfielder for UAE Pro League side Al Bataeh.

Career statistics

Club

Notes

References

External links
 

2000 births
Living people
Emirati footballers
Emirati people of Baloch descent
Association football midfielders
UAE Pro League players
Al Ain FC players
Al Bataeh Club players